William Warner (January 28, 1812July 1868) was a Michigan politician.

Early life and education
Warner was born in Pittsford, Vermont on January 28, 1812. Warner graduated from Middlebury College. Warner initially studied for the ministry, but abandoned this pursuit due to health considerations.

Career
Warner served for several years as the treasurer of the University of Vermont. Warner was connected with the Vermont Central Railroad until 1855, when he arrived in Detroit. In 1860, Warner got involved with the lumber business until 1860, when he got involved with the Detroit Bridge and Iron Works. On November 4, 1862, Warner was elected to the Michigan House of Representatives, where he represented the Wayne County 1st district from January 7, 1863 to December 31, 1864. On November 6, 1866, Warner represented the same district again from January 2, 1866 to December 31, 1867.

Death
Warner died in July 1868. At the time of his death, he was the president of Detroit Bridge and Iron Works.

References

1812 births
1868 deaths
American treasurers
People from Pittsford, Vermont
Politicians from Detroit
Middlebury College alumni
University of Vermont faculty
Republican Party members of the Michigan House of Representatives
19th-century American politicians